The 1873–74 season was the third season of competitive football in England.  Oxford University beat the Royal Engineers 2–0 in the FA Cup

Aston Villa Football Club were formed in March 1874 by members of the Villa Cross Wesleyan Chapel in Handsworth which is now part of Birmingham. The founders were members of the chapel's cricket team looking for a way to stay fit during the winter months.

National team

* England score given first

Key
 A = Away match
 F = Friendly

Honours

References

External links
Report on Scotland v England match on thefa.com